Capitão João Busse Airport  is the airport serving Apucarana, Brazil. It is named after Captain João Alexandre Busse (1886-1921), the first aviator born in the state of Paraná.

It is operated by the Municipality of Apucarana under the supervision of Aeroportos do Paraná (SEIL).

Airlines and destinations

No scheduled flights operate at this airport.

Access

See also

List of airports in Brazil

References

External links

Airports in Paraná (state)
Apucarana